The Tscherne classification is a system of categorization of soft tissue injuries.

Classification

Reliability
The intraobserver (observations at two different times by the same person) agreement for Tscherne classification is 85%; while for inter-observer agreement is 65%.

History
This classification system was developed by Harald Tscherne and Hans-Jörg Oestern in 1982 at the Hannover Medical School (Hanover, Germany) to classify both open and closed fractures. This classification system is based on the physiological concept that the higher the kinetic energy imparted on the bone, the higher the kinetic energy imparted on the soft tissue. It also serves as a tool to guide management and to predict clinical outcomes. It also serves as a communication tool in research and in clinical presentations.

See also
 Gustilo open fracture classification

References

Bone fractures
Orthopedic classifications
Soft tissue disorders
Skin conditions resulting from physical factors